The Encyclopædia Meysari is a Persian medical encyclopaedia written by the Persian Meysari between AD 977 (367 AH) and AD 980 (370 AH). A manuscript with number R-7799-310 is in Bibliothèque nationale de France.

Name
Meysari named his work Dānešnāma, in Persian means Encyclopedia (book[nāma] of knowledge[dāneš]), once in the beginning of his book   and then at the end of it. The only existing manuscript of the work kept in the National Library of France has 164 folios and consists of 4481 lines. It was copied by Mahmud Tabrizi who was Shahnameh-khani (the reciter of Shahnameh) in AD 1448 (852 AH).

References

External links
 http://ensani.ir/file/download/article/20120506070312-6001-115.pdf

Medical works of medieval Iran
Medical works of the medieval Islamic world
Persian encyclopedias
Persian literature
Works about the history of medicine
Iranian books